Moshe Sinai (born 22 February 1961) is a former professional footballer who works as the director of football for Hapoel Tel Aviv.

Honours
Hapoel Tel Aviv
Liga Leumit: 1980–81, 1985–86, 1987–88
Israel State Cup: 1982–83

Bnei Yehuda
Liga Leumit: 1989–90

Individual
Footballer of the Year - Israel: 1981, 1990

External links

1961 births
Living people
Israeli footballers
Association football midfielders
Israel international footballers
Maccabi Jaffa F.C. players
Hapoel Tel Aviv F.C. players
K.S.K. Beveren players
Bnei Yehuda Tel Aviv F.C. players
Israeli football managers
Hapoel Tel Aviv F.C. managers
Maccabi Petah Tikva F.C. managers
Maccabi Herzliya F.C. managers
Israeli Premier League players
Footballers from Jaffa
Israeli expatriate footballers
Expatriate footballers in Belgium
Israeli expatriate sportspeople in Belgium
Israeli Footballer of the Year recipients